Initiative for Catalonia Greens–United and Alternative Left (ICV–EUiA) was an electoral alliance formed by Initiative for Catalonia Greens and United and Alternative Left to contest elections in Catalonia. Since 2015 both parties have participated in several coalitions: En Comú Podem for the 2015 and 2016 general elections, Catalunya Sí que es Pot for the 2015 Catalan regional election, and Catalunya en Comú for the 2017 Catalan regional election. Currently, they are represented in the Spanish Congress of Deputies within En Comú Podem and in the Parliament of Catalonia within Catalunya en Comú–Podem.

Composition

Electoral performance

Parliament of Catalonia

Cortes Generales

Notes

References

 
2003 establishments in Spain
Defunct political parties in Catalonia
Defunct political party alliances in Spain
Political parties in Catalonia
Political parties established in 2003